Naval Base Saipan or Naval Advance Base Saipan or Naval Air Base Saipan was a United States Navy Naval base built during World War II to support Pacific Ocean theater of war and the many warships and troops fighting the war. The base was on the island of Saipan in the Northern Mariana Islands. The base was part of the Pacific island hopping campaign. The base construction started after the Battle of Saipan ended on July 9, 1944. US Naval Advance Base Saipan was constructed by the Seabees Naval Mobile Construction Battalions. The base was under the Commander Naval Forces Marianas. About 70% of the island was sugarcane cultivation at the start of the base construction. At the start of the Battle of Saipan, the island's population had about 30,000 Japanese troops and about 20,000 Japanese civilians. The city of Garapan was the administrative center for the Saipan governmental district.

The Navy used 110 ships to bring troops and equipment to Saipan from Hawaii. Included in the Saipan fleet were 37 troopships (APA and AP), 11 cargo ships  (AKA and AK), 5 Dock landing ships, 47 Landing Ship, Tank and 10 Auxiliary ships. For the battle and base, 74,986 tons of cargo was moved, at 7,845,194 cubic feet of cargo. After the war, Saipan remained a US Navy base. In 1962 Saipan became the headquarters of the U.S. administered United Nations trust territories of the Pacific Islands till 1986.

Seabees Construction
The first Seabee Construction Battalions landed with the United States Marine Corps on June 15, 1944, at Chalan Kanoa on the west coast of Saipan. The 121st and the 18th Seabee Construction Battalions with parts of 92nd and 67th Battalions start unloading equipment for the battle and base operations. The Seabees repaired the captured airfields, the northern island runway and the Aslito Airfield. Both airfields were repaired with crushed coral and marston mat. The captured aviation fuel tanks were usable and the Seabees filled them from shore tankers. After the repairs were complete, United States Army Air Forces started patrols fights from the runway also. The Seabees used a captured pier to unload cargo ships. On June 21 Seabees of the 121st Construction Battalion began to repair the shell-damaged railroad tracks that ran from Charan Kanoa to Aslito Airfield and by June 25 supply trains started running. The other tracks in the area were also repaired. Construction Battalions did road repair and started depot construction. After the capture of Tanapag Harbor, Seabees repaired and expanded the port facilities. Japanese resistance on Saipan ended on July 9. On September 13, 1944, the Seabees were given the order to turn Saipan into a major Advance Base. Much of the damaged equipment on the island was removed first. The 39th, 17th, 101st, 117th, 595th and 614th Construction Battalions and the 31st Special Battalion joined in the construction. To keep boats on the flighting front there was a great demand for bases that could repair and restock boats in remote ports, Advance Base Saipan was able to repair and restock boats. Large ships in need of repair went to Naval Advance Base Espiritu Santo. The base became a major resting place for troops and a regroup spot. Many of the wounded troops from the Battle of Iwo Jima and the Okinawa campaign were taken to the hospital on Saipan. By the end of the war, Saipan had 9,500 hospital beds in seven hospitals. The Seabees built two new , asphalted runways at Aslito Airfield. These were used for the Boeing B-29 Superfortress bombers. At the end of the war, the Japanese civilians that had survived were returned to the Japanese homeland.

Facilities
Facilities built, repaired or expanded, 7,000 buildings were built.
 Tanapag Harbor Navy port, 3 Liberty ship beths, masonry pier and two x pontoon piers. Ramp for LST's, LCT's, and LCM's. Seabees dredged the Harbor, so large ships could dock.
 Chalan Kanoa, minor port
Housing, 4,250 men in quonset huts
 Seabee camp for 2,500 men
 Seabee depot
Boat-repair facilities
Seaplane base Tanapag  concrete ramp, at Flores Point, VP-16 with Martin PBM Mariner 
Naval supply depot
Chalan Kanoa railroad
Capitol Hill camp
 San Roque Magazine camp
 Micro Beach landing
 Lower Base camp
 Two radio stations 
Naval hospital, 400-beds
 Army hospital, 1,000-beds
 Army hospital, 2,000-bed (Iwo Jima and Okinawa campaigns)
 Army Station Hospital 176, 600-beds
 Army Station Hospital 39, 600-beds
 Two small Hospitals
Ammunition depot, 500 acres
Fleet recreation areas  (85 Buildings, tennis courts, volleyball, baseball and softball fields. 
Major Harbor developments
Chapel
Crash boat base
 Aviation Overhaul shop
 Base for 12,000 Army Air Corp
 Officers Club
 Motor pool
 Quartermaster Laundry
 PT Boat base
 AA gun emplacements
 Naval Air Transport Service Facilities
 Large Tank farms for: Fuel oil, aviation fuel, diesel fuel, gasoline
 Navy Bank
 Fleet Post Office FPO# 3245 SF Saipan Island, Marianas Islands
 Mess halls
 Navy Communication Center
 Troop store
 Two seaplane hangars
 Aviation supply annex
 11 refrigerator storage sheds
 Barge with a 12-ton crane
 6x18 foot and 4x15 Auxiliary floating drydock
Garapan pier
Torpedo assembly center
Bahia Laulau, also called Magicienne Bay or Lau Lau Bay, ship anchorage only.
 Pads for over 100 airplanes
Susupe Internment Camp, housed 13,000 Japanese civilians
Power stations

Postwar:
 International Broadcasting Bureau Voice of America broadcast site.
 Navy Technical Training Unit.

Airfields
Saipan airfields built and/or repaired by Seabees:
East Field (Saipan) (Kagman Field) built by 51st CB
Aslito Field, now Saipan International Airport
Marpi Point Field built by Seabees
Kobler Field
Isely airfield No. 1
Each airfield had housing, mess hall and depots.

See also

Seabees in World War II
Battle of the Eastern Solomons
US Naval Advance Bases
Tinian Naval Base

References

External links
Video Saipan Navy Base 1944
Video Saipan 1944 - Piercing Japan's Pacific Defences
Video The Deadly Surprise That Awaited U.S. Troops on Saipan
Video, An Island Called Saipan

Military installations established in 1944
Naval Stations of the United States Navy
World War II airfields in the Pacific Ocean Theater
Airfields of the United States Navy
1962 disestablishments in Oceania
Military installations closed in 1962
Closed installations of the United States Navy